Jason Sampson (born February 21, 1982) is an American professional mixed martial artist currently competing in the flyweight division of Legacy FC. A professional competitor since 2009, Sampson has previously competed for Bellator and Shark Fights.

Background
Born and raised in Dallas, Texas, Sampson, along with his two brothers, competed in wrestling. Sampson began wrestling at the age of 12 and wrestled at MacArthur High School. Sampson was talented, earning three state titles, and continued his wrestling career at The Apprentice School in Newport News, Virginia, where he earned NCWA All-American honors. Sampson was involved in a freak accident during his collegiate career in which his opponent broke his neck and became paralyzed despite Sampson using a legal move. Sampson was heavily affected by the incident and the school received a lawsuit, which was later dismissed. Sampson then began training in Brazilian jiu-jitsu before transitioning into mixed martial arts.

Mixed martial arts career

Early career
After going 9–1 as an amateur, Sampson made his professional debut on November 28, 2009, winning via submission in the first round. Sampson would then compile a record of 8–1 before making his Bellator debut.

Bellator
Sampson made his Bellator debut against Jeremy Myers on March 16, 2012 at Bellator 61. Sampson won the fight via rear-naked choke submission in the third round.

Sampson faced Chris Pham on January 24, 2013 at Bellator 86. He won the fight via armbar submission in the third round.

Sampson faced Danny Sykora at Bellator 128 on October 10, 2014. He won the fight via unanimous decision.

Legacy Fighting Championship
Sampson made his flyweight debut against former UFC competitor Joseph Sandoval at Legacy FC 38 on February 13, 2015. He won the fight via TKO due to punches in the first round.

Mixed martial arts record

|-
| Win
| align=center| 12–1
| Joseph Sandoval
| TKO (punches)
| Legacy FC 38
| 
| align=center| 1
| align=center| 1:36
| Allen, Texas, United States
| 
|-
| Win
| align=center| 11–1
| Danny Sykora
| Decision (unanimous)
| Bellator 128
| 
| align=center| 3
| align=center| 5:00
| Thackerville, Oklahoma, United States
| 
|-
| Win
| align=center| 10–1
| Chris Pham
| Submission (armbar)
| Bellator 86
| 
| align=center| 3
| align=center| 4:55
| Thackerville, Oklahoma, United States
| 
|-
| Win
| align=center| 9–1
| Jeremy Myers
| Submission (rear-naked choke)
| Bellator 61
| 
| align=center| 3
| align=center| 2:25
| Bossier City, Louisiana, United States
| 
|-
| Loss
| align=center| 8–1
| Joshua Montoya
| Decision (split)
| Fight Game: Premier Event
| 
| align=center| 3
| align=center| 5:00
| Frisco, Texas, United States
| 
|-
| Win
| align=center| 8–0
| Joshua Montoya
| Submission (armbar)
| MMA Fight Pit: Genesis
| 
| align=center| 1
| align=center| 2:38
| Albuquerque, New Mexico, United States
| 
|-
| Win
| align=center| 7–0
| Randy Villarreal
| TKO (punches)
| Undisputed MMA 1
| 
| align=center| 2
| align=center| 0:14
| Amarillo, Texas, United States
| 
|-
| Win
| align=center| 6–0
| Erik Perez
| Decision (split)
| STFC 12: Tuff Enough
| 
| align=center| 3
| align=center| 3:00
| Mcallen, Texas, United States
| 
|-
| Win
| align=center| 5–0
| Shane Howell
| Submission
| Bricktown Brawl 5
| 
| align=center| 1
| align=center| 4:14
| Oklahoma City, Oklahoma, United States
| 
|-
| Win
| align=center| 4–0
| Jeremiah Castillo
| TKO (punches)
| Shark Fights 11: Humes vs Buentello
| 
| align=center| 1
| align=center| 1:33
| Odessa, Texas, United States
| 
|-
| Win
| align=center| 3–0
| Jeremy Valderaz
| Submission (armbar)
| Shark Fights 9: Phillips vs Evans
| 
| align=center| 1
| align=center| 2:50
| Amarillo, Texas, United States
| 
|-
| Win
| align=center| 2–0
| Larry Garcia
| Submission (armbar)
| KOK 8: The Uprising
| 
| align=center| 1
| align=center| 1:03
| Austin, Texas, United States
| 
|-
| Win
| align=center| 1–0
| Nate Garza
| Submission (rear-naked choke)
| SWC 9: Redemption
| 
| align=center| 1
| align=center| 1:25
| Frisco, Texas, United States
|

References

Living people
1982 births
American male mixed martial artists
Flyweight mixed martial artists
Mixed martial artists utilizing collegiate wrestling
Mixed martial artists utilizing Brazilian jiu-jitsu
American practitioners of Brazilian jiu-jitsu
People awarded a black belt in Brazilian jiu-jitsu
American male sport wrestlers